Mariasilvia Spolato (25 June 1935 – 31 October 2018) was an Italian activist for LGBT rights, lesbian feminist, magazine founder and publisher. She was one of the pioneers of the homosexual rights movement and the first woman in Italy to publicly declare her homosexuality. For this reason she was discriminated and persecuted, losing her job as a maths school teacher in 1972. In the 1970s Spolato was also active in the "Pompeo Magno" feminist collective in Rome. In 1971 she was one of the founders of the militant organization Fuori! ("Out!"), acronym of Fronte Unitario Omosessuale Rivoluzionario Italiano (United Revolutionary Italian Homosexual Front) and of its eponymous periodical.

References

External links

1935 births
2018 deaths
People from Padua
University of Padua alumni
Italian LGBT rights activists
Italian magazine publishers (people)
Italian magazine founders
Italian LGBT scientists
Italian lesbians